Norman Frederick Mitchell (19 February 1900 – 8 March 1973) was an Australian sportsman who played first-class cricket for Victoria in the Sheffield Shield and Australian rules football with St Kilda in the Victorian Football League (VFL).

Mitchell's three VFL games came midway through the 1925 season and were against Fitzroy, South Melbourne and Essendon. An Old Melburnian, he played his early football at Melbourne University.

As a cricketer he was a right-handed opening batsman and got few opportunities to represent Victoria because they had a prolific pair in Bill Woodfull and Bill Ponsford. In the four first-class matches that he was picked in, two of them in the Sheffield Shield, it was as a middle order batsman. He made the most of his chance in a match against Tasmania at the Melbourne Cricket Ground in 1926/27 when he scored 220 of Victoria's 552 first innings runs. Mitchell then dismissed Tasmanian Alfred Watson twice with the ball and also took three catches to round off a good all round performance. His only other wicket at first-class level had come on his debut against New Zealand and was All Blacks rugby player Charlie Oliver. Despite Mitchell's efforts in the Tasmania match, he wasn't picked for Victoria ever again.

Later on in his life, Mitchell became a County Court Judge.

See also
 List of Victoria first-class cricketers

References

External links

Cricinfo: Norman Mitchell

1900 births
1973 deaths
Australian cricketers
Victoria cricketers
People from Collingwood, Victoria
St Kilda Football Club players
Cricketers from Melbourne
Australian rules footballers from Melbourne